You in Reverse is the sixth full-length album released by indie rock band Built to Spill.  The band added one new member for this album, making Built to Spill a quartet for the first time.  It was also the first album since Ultimate Alternative Wavers not recorded or produced by Phil Ek.  The lineup was Doug Martsch, Brett Nelson, Scott Plouf, and Jim Roth.  The album was recorded in Portland, Oregon at Audible Alchemy.  You in Reverse was released on April 11, 2006.

Track listing
All songs written by Built To Spill.
 "Goin' Against Your Mind" – 8:41
 "Traces" – 4:43
 "Liar" – 5:11
 "Saturday" – 2:25
 "Wherever You Go" – 6:10
 "Conventional Wisdom" – 6:22
 "Gone" – 5:41
 "Mess with Time" – 5:43
 "Just a Habit" – 4:27
 "The Wait" – 5:00

Personnel
Doug Martsch - vocals, guitar, keyboards, percussion
Jim Roth - guitar
Brett Nelson - bass
Scott Plouf - drums, percussion

Additional musicians
Steven Wray Lobdell - guitar, piano, vibraphone, and percussion (he is credited as a "utility player" in the album notes, which do not specify what instruments he plays or on which tracks he appears)
Sam Coomes - organ on "Gone"
Brett Netson - guitars on "Goin' Against Your Mind", "Conventional Wisdom", "Gone", and "Just A Habit"

References

2006 albums
Built to Spill albums
Warner Records albums